"Stairway to the Stars" is a popular song composed by Matty Malneck and Frank Signorelli, with lyrics by Mitchell Parish. It was based on a theme from Malneck and Signorelli's 1934 instrumental piece, "Park Avenue Fantasy."

Hit recordings in 1939 were by Glenn Miller, Kay Kyser, Jimmy Dorsey and by Al Donohue.

Notable recordings
 Glenn Miller and His Orchestra, vocals by Ray Eberle (May 9, 1939)
 Ella Fitzgerald and her Famous Orchestra (June 29, 1939)
 The Ink Spots – 1939 NBC radio Broadcast (July 12, 1939)
 Jimmy Dorsey and his Orchestra, vocals by Bob Eberly (1939)
 Kay Kyser and his Orchestra, vocals by Harry Babbitt (1939)
 Al Donahue and his Orchestra, vocals by Paula Kelly (1939)
 Carmen Cavallaro – Decca (1947)
 Dinah Washington with Chubby Jackson's Orchestra (1947)
 Buddy DeFranco quartet – New York (1953)
 Benny Goodman – An Album of Swing Classics (1955)
 Bud Powell – Piano Interpretations by Bud Powell (1956)
 Sarah Vaughan – At Mister Kelly's (1957)
 Lee Konitz – Very Cool 1957
 Ella Fitzgerald – Hello, Love (1960)
 Johnny Mathis – I'll Buy You a Star (1961)
 Milt Jackson and Wes Montgomery – Bags Meets Wes! (1962)
 Stan Kenton – Adventures In Jazz (1962)
 Bill Evans – Moon Beams (1962)
 Dexter Gordon – Our Man in Paris (1963)
 Johnny Hartman – I Just Dropped by to Say Hello (1964)
 Natalie Cole – Don't Look Back (1980)
 Mel Tormé – An Evening with Mel Tormé (1994)
 Ian Shaw – The Abbey Road Sessions (2011)

Notable uses
 Major theme in the motion picture Some Like It Hot, directed by Billy Wilder.

References

1939 singles
1930s jazz standards
Ella Fitzgerald songs
Johnny Mathis songs
Songs with lyrics by Mitchell Parish
Songs with music by Matty Malneck